Sam William Gagner (born August 10, 1989) is a Canadian professional ice hockey player who plays in the National Hockey League (NHL) for the Winnipeg Jets.

He was drafted by the Edmonton Oilers in the first round, 6th overall, of the 2007 NHL Entry Draft, and played there for the first seven years of his NHL career. He also played one season each for the Arizona Coyotes, Philadelphia Flyers, Columbus Blue Jackets and the Vancouver Canucks before returning to Edmonton in 2019; he was then traded to the Detroit Red Wings in 2020.

Playing career

Amateur 
Gagner played midget hockey with the Toronto Marlboros of the Greater Toronto Hockey League (GTHL) in 2004–05. He scored 173 points and was awarded the Buck Houle Award, a Marlboros team award given for outstanding on ice performance and leadership. The same season, he made his junior debut, playing 13 games for the Milton Icehawks of the OPJHL, scoring 15 points. His dad was the coach of his minor hockey career.  In 2005–06, he joined the Sioux City Musketeers of the United States Hockey League (USHL) and scored 46 points in 56 games, second in team scoring. Along the way, Gagner played with future NHLer John Tavares on the Marlboros and later the Icehawks. As early as 2002, the pair also honed their skills and became friends on a backyard rink built by Sam's dad Dave in Oakville.

Gagner originally committed to play hockey at the collegiate level for the University of Wisconsin–Madison, but later decided to stay closer to home by playing for a Canadian major junior hockey team. Considered a first round talent, the Ontario Hockey League (OHL)'s London Knights selected him in the fourth round of the 2005 OHL Entry Draft on a flyer, as his commitment to play college hockey deterred many OHL teams from drafting him. Joined by future NHL stars Patrick Kane and Sergei Kostitsyn on the Knights' top line in 2006–07, Gagner scored 118 points in 53 games, fifth in OHL scoring. He also captained Team Burns/Bergeron (Red) in the 2007 CHL Top Prospects Game to a 5–3 victory over Team Bowman/Demers (White).

Professional

Edmonton Oilers
Gagner was drafted in the first round, sixth overall by the Edmonton Oilers in the 2007 NHL Entry Draft. On October 1, 2007, he was then signed to a three-year, entry-level contract with the Oilers. He played his first NHL game on October 4 in a 3–2 shootout victory over the San Jose Sharks and earned his first NHL point, assisting on a goal scored by defenceman Tom Gilbert. On October 20, Gagner scored his first career NHL goal against Miikka Kiprusoff of the Calgary Flames.

As the NHL's youngest player in 2007–08, he tallied 49 points in 79 games playing between wingers and fellow rookies Andrew Cogliano and Robert Nilsson on a combination dubbed the "Kid Line." During the season, Gagner participated in the 2008 NHL YoungStars Game in Atlanta as part of All-Star weekend and was also named the NHL Rookie of the Month for February. As part of a month-long scoring stretch in which he scored 13 points in 12 games, he also established an Oilers team record for the longest assists streak by a rookie with nine in eight straight games.

The next season, 2008–09, he recorded his first career NHL hat-trick and added an assist for a four-point game in an 8–1 win against the Colorado Avalanche on March 19, 2009. He finished his sophomore season with 16 goals and 41 points in 76 games. In the following two campaigns, he posted 41- and 42-point efforts.

On March 9, 2011, Gagner severed a tendon in his left hand while facing the Washington Capitals when teammate Ryan Jones caught him with a skate blade while jumping over the boards. Requiring surgery, Gagner was sidelined for the remainder of the 2010–11 season, as well as one month into the following campaign, making his return to the Oilers line-up on October 22, 2011. Several months later, on February 2, 2012, Gagner scored four goals and four assists against the Chicago Blackhawks, tying the team record of eight points in a game, previously set by Wayne Gretzky and Paul Coffey. The feat also made him the 13th NHL player of all time to score eight or more points in a single game, and the first since Mario Lemieux did it in 1989. Two days later, Gagner scored two goals and added an assist in the first period against the Detroit Red Wings, setting a new Oilers record with 11 consecutive points, previously held by Gretzky, who scored ten consecutive points twice his career. Gagner finished the season with 47 points over 75 games, with nearly a quarter of his output having occurred in that two-game stretch.

During the 2012–13 NHL lock-out, Gagner signed with Klagenfurter AC of the Eishockey Liga in Austria. On July 22, 2013, shortly after the end of the 2012–13 season, the Oilers signed Gagner to a three-year contract extension worth an average annual value of $4.8 million.

Trade to Arizona
On June 29, 2014, the Tampa Bay Lightning acquired Gagner in exchange for Teddy Purcell. Gagner, however, only spent an hour as a member of the Lightning before then being acquired by the Arizona Coyotes, along with B. J. Crombeen, in exchange for a sixth-round pick in the 2015 NHL Entry Draft.

During the Coyotes' training camp ahead of the 2014–15 season, Arizona Head Coach Dave Tippett experimented utilizing Gagner on the right wing instead of his natural centre position, where he played in a pre-season, 5–4 shootout victory over the Los Angeles Kings. With a fresh start, former  with Arizona, Gagner found chemistry playing on a line with centre Martin Hanzal; the two combined for 16 points in just five games in December and January 2015.

Philadelphia Flyers/Columbus Blue Jackets
On June 27, 2015, Gagner was traded to the Philadelphia Flyers along with a conditional third (2017) or fourth (2016) round draft pick in return for Nicklas Grossmann and the contract of Chris Pronger. Coyotes general manager Don Maloney explained the trade as being due to a belief in the organization that Gagner "couldn't play centre at the NHL level".

On August 1, 2016, Gagner signed a one-year deal with the Columbus Blue Jackets. Following a resurgent season with the Blue Jackets where he set a career high in points with 50, Gagner signed a 3-year $9.45 million contract with the Vancouver Canucks.

Vancouver Canucks and return to Edmonton
Prior to the 2018–19 season, after attending the Canucks training camp and pre-season Gagner was placed on waivers by the Canucks on October 1, 2018. He cleared waivers the next day, and was loaned in order to be closer to his family to the Toronto Marlies, affiliate of the Toronto Maple Leafs. Gagner scored 15 points in 15 games with the Marlies before he was recalled by the injury-struck Canucks on November 18, 2018. He registered 1 goal and 3 points in 7 games before Vancouver returned to health and he was returned to the Marlies on December 4, 2018.

Through 43 games with the Marlies, Gagner was among the team's top scorers with 37 points. He was traded by the Canucks in a return to his original draft club, the Edmonton Oilers, in exchange for Ryan Spooner on February 16, 2019. During the 2019–20 season, Gagner recorded five goals and seven assists in 36 games for the Oilers.

Detroit Red Wings
On February 24, 2020, Gagner was traded at the NHL trade deadline from the Oilers, along with second-round draft picks in 2020 and 2021, to the Detroit Red Wings in exchange for Andreas Athanasiou and Ryan Kuffner. He added one goal in 6 games with the Red Wings before their season was prematurely ended due to the COVID-19 pandemic suspending play.

On September 26, 2020, the Red Wings signed Gagner to a one-year, $850,000 contract extension. On July 28, 2021, the Red Wings signed Gagner to a one-year contract extension.

Winnipeg Jets
As a free agent from the Red Wings, Gagner continued his career by signing for his 16th season in the NHL in agreeing to a one-year, league minimum $750,000 contract with the Winnipeg Jets on September 2, 2022. In a depth forward role for the Jets in the  season, Gagner played his 1000th NHL career game on December 29, 2022, against the Vancouver Canucks. He contributed with 8 goals and 6 assists for 14 points in 48 regular season games before he was ruled out for the remainder of the campaign with season ending surgery to both hips on March 16, 2023.

International play 

Gagner competed for Canada at the 2007 World Junior Championships in Sweden, playing in all six games as the youngest player on the team, helping Canada to their third of five-straight gold medals.

Later that year, upon being selected in the 2007 NHL Entry Draft, Gagner competed in the 2007 Super Series, an eight-game series between Canada's and Russia's national junior teams commemorating the 1972 Summit Series. He scored 15 points and was named series MVP, as Canada defeated Russia 7–0–1 in the series.

After Gagner's 2007–08 rookie season with the Oilers, he made his senior international debut with Canada in the 2008 World Championships in Canada as a reserve. Gagner played in one preliminary game as Canada was defeated in the gold medal game by Russia.

Personal life 
In his rookie year, Gagner lived in a house provided by Oilers captain Ethan Moreau, along with teammates Andrew Cogliano and Tom Gilbert. In the summer of 2009, Gilbert bought his own house while Gagner and Cogliano each got apartments in Edmonton in the same complex. During the off-season, Gagner goes back to his hometown of London, Ontario.

Gagner is the son of former NHL player Dave Gagner, who spent 15 seasons with the Rangers, North Stars/Stars, Flames, Maple Leafs, Panthers and Canucks. Due to his dad's career, Sam Gagner grew up in Minneapolis, Dallas, Toronto, Calgary, Miami, Vancouver and Oakville. His sister, Jessica Gagner, played hockey for the Dartmouth Big Green women's ice hockey program.

Gagner married longtime girlfriend Dr. Rachel Linke in Muskoka, Ontario, on July 12, 2014. They have three children.

Career statistics

Regular season and playoffs

International

Awards and honours

Records
Edmonton Oilers Most Points in a Single Game – 8 (shared with Wayne Gretzky and Paul Coffey)
Edmonton Oilers Most Points in a Single Period – 5 (shared with Jari Kurri)

References

External links 

 

1989 births
Arizona Coyotes players
Bakersfield Condors players
Canadian ice hockey centres
Columbus Blue Jackets players
Detroit Red Wings players
Edmonton Oilers draft picks
Edmonton Oilers players
Ice hockey people from Ontario
Lehigh Valley Phantoms players
Living people
London Knights players
National Hockey League first-round draft picks
Philadelphia Flyers players
Sioux City Musketeers players
Sportspeople from London, Ontario
Toronto Marlies players
Vancouver Canucks players
Winnipeg Jets players